Mall Molesworth defeated Esna Boyd 6–1, 7–5 in the final to win the women's singles tennis title at the 1923 Australian Championships.

Draw

Finals

References

1923 in women's tennis
Women's Singles
1923 in Australian women's sport